The Manila Philippines Temple is a temple of the Church of Jesus Christ of Latter-day Saints (LDS Church) in Quezon City, Philippines. It is the 29th operating temple of the LDS Church.

History

The LDS Church was officially recognized in the Philippines in 1961 and in a meeting with servicemen, American residents, and Filipino members on 28 April 1961, Gordon B. Hinckley dedicated the country. Church membership grew quickly in the Philippines necessitating a temple. On April 1, 1981, the LDS Church announced that a temple would be built in the Philippines. Earlier that year, the church had purchased land in Quezon City, in the Metro Manila area. The site was partly chosen because of its accessibility to members throughout the temple district. The groundbreaking and site dedication for the Manila Philippines Temple were held on August 25, 1982. Hinckley, then serving as a member of the church's First Presidency, dedicated the temple on September 25, 1984.

Beginning on December 2, 1989, during the 1989 Philippine coup attempt, rebel forces briefly occupied the temple grounds and some surrounding auxiliary buildings. Dignardino Espi, director of temple security at the time, convinced the rebels not to enter the temple itself. Following a standoff with government troops, the rebels vacated the area on December 4. The temple suffered only superficial damage during the incident.

As of 2020, the Philippines had 800,000 church members, the fourth largest number of any country in the world. There is another operating temple in Cebu City and one under construction in Urdaneta. Four more temples were announced in 2018 and 2019, which are the Alabang, Cagayan de Oro, Davao City, and Bacolod temples, but no dates have been set for the groundbreaking ceremonies. The Manila Philippines Temple also serves members in Indonesia, Singapore, Thailand, India, Sri Lanka, Malaysia, Cambodia, Burma, Micronesia, Guam, and Kwajalein. The LDS Church has more than 800 buildings and 20 missions in the country.

In 2020, the LDS Church canceled services temporarily in response to the spread of the coronavirus pandemic.

See also

 The Church of Jesus Christ of Latter-day Saints in the Philippines
 Comparison of temples of The Church of Jesus Christ of Latter-day Saints
 List of temples of The Church of Jesus Christ of Latter-day Saints
 List of temples of The Church of Jesus Christ of Latter-day Saints by geographic region
 Temple architecture (LDS Church)

References

External links
 
 Manila Philippines Temple official site
 Manila Philippines Temple at ChurchofJesusChristTemples.org

The Church of Jesus Christ of Latter-day Saints in the Philippines
Temples (LDS Church) in the Philippines
Religious buildings and structures in Metro Manila
Buildings and structures in Quezon City
20th-century Latter Day Saint temples
Religious buildings and structures completed in 1984
1984 establishments in the Philippines
20th-century religious buildings and structures in the Philippines